Sargodon tomicus is an extinct semionotid fish from the Late Triassic of Italy.

See also

 Prehistoric fish
 List of prehistoric bony fish

External links
 Bony fish in the online Sepkoski Database

Prehistoric ray-finned fish genera
Semionotiformes
Triassic bony fish
Late Triassic fish
Fossils of Italy
Triassic fish of Europe